Archie Aldis "Red" Emmerson (born 1929) is the founder of Sierra Pacific Industries, a lumber products company that operates in California, Oregon and Washington. With 2.33 million acres, Emmerson and his family rank as America’s largest private landowners, according to a profile by Eric O’Keefe in the 2021 Land Report 100.

Early life
Born in Grand Ronde, Oregon in 1929, and lived his early years in meager surroundings.  He attended school while his father, R.H. "Curly" Emmerson built sawmills in Oregon and California.

Career
In 1948, at age 19, Emmerson arrived in Arcata, California where he began working in mills learning as much as he could about every job in the plant.

In 1949 Emmerson and his father formed a partnership and went into the lumber business together, eventually producing manufacturing facilities in the northwest.  Under Emmerson's management the company grew into Sierra Pacific Industries (SPI) – now the second largest lumber producer in the U.S.

According to the Land Report 100, the Emmerson family is the largest private landowner in the United States.

Philanthropy
Through the Sierra Pacific Foundation, the Emmersons have given millions of dollars in community contributions.  The Foundation was established in 1979 by Red's father.  Over the years, Red has continued to fund the Foundation to meet its philanthropic commitment to worthy organizations, community projects, youth activities, and student scholarships for the communities where the company has operating facilities.

Personal life
He has three children and lives in Redding, California. His sons George and Mark are president and chairman of SPI. His daughter Carolyn is the president of the Sierra Pacific Foundation. His wife of 40 years, Ida, died of breast cancer in 1996.

Recognition
1998 Golden Plate Award of the American Academy of Achievement
2008 New California Hall of Fame
2019 Timber Processing magazine’s Person of the Year
2019 West Coast Lumber & Building Material Association (WCLBMA) Lifetime Achievement Award

References

External links
 Sierra Pacific Industries

American billionaires
Living people
1929 births
20th-century American landowners
20th-century American businesspeople